Kokuli may refer to:

 Kokuli, Arizona, an historical name for Hickiwan, Arizona, a populated place in Pima County
 Kokuli, Greece, the Turkish eponym for Koukouli, Ioannina, a village of the Zagori region